In nautical contexts, a cleat is a device for securing a rope.

Types
Types of cleat designs include the following:

 A horn cleat is the traditional design, featuring two “horns” extending parallel to the deck or the axis of the spar, attached to a flat surface or a spar, and resembling an anvil.
 A cam cleat in which one or two spring-loaded cams pinch the rope, allowing the rope to be adjusted easily, and quickly released when under load. 
 A jam cleat in which the line is pinched in a v-shaped slot.
 A clam cleat (or jam cleat) in which the rope is held between two fluted stationary pieces. Such a cleat vaguely resembles two halves of a clam shell held back to back. It is more compact than a cam cleat, but the rope is  less easily released under load.

A cleat hitch is a knot used to secure a rope to a cleat.

References

Bibliography
 Ashley, Clifford W. (1993) [1944], The Ashley Book of Knots, New York: Doubleday, p. Dust jacket,

External links 

 
 http://www.bcx.news/photos/things/water/nautical/cleats/

Watercraft components